Robert Michael Baker (born 24 July 1975) is an Australian former first-class cricketer who played for Western Australia. He played as a right-handed batsman and occasional slow left-arm orthodox bowler.

He showed great promise as a junior cricketer – being a skillful middle-order batsman and handy bowler. He was represented the Australian Under 19 side in 1993 and 1994 (as captain) and attended the Commonwealth Bank Cricket Academy in 1994. He became a regular in the Western Australian side, but a debilitating onset of chronic fatigue syndrome forced him from the game when he was only 26 years old.

Baker was the second player and first Western Australian to take a hat-trick in a domestic one-day match.

Baker would moist likely play for Australia but unfortunately got chronic fatigue.

References

External links

Australian cricketers
1975 births
Living people
Western Australia cricketers
Cricketers from Perth, Western Australia
Sportsmen from Western Australia